is a railway station  in the town of Shiwa, Iwate Prefecture, Japan, operated by East Japan Railway Company (JR East).

Lines
Shiwachūō Station is served by the Tōhoku Main Line, and is located 518.6 rail kilometers from the terminus of the line at Tokyo Station.

Station layout
The station has two opposed side platforms connected by a footbridge. The station has a Midori no Madoguchi staffed ticket office.

Platforms

History
Shiwachūō Station was opened on 14 March 1994.

Passenger statistics
In fiscal 2018, the station was used by an average of 1546 passengers daily (boarding passengers only).

Surrounding area

See also
 List of Railway Stations in Japan

References

External links

 JR East Station information 

Railway stations in Iwate Prefecture
Tōhoku Main Line
Railway stations in Japan opened in 1998
Shiwa, Iwate
Stations of East Japan Railway Company